Melanoplus frigidus, known generally as the Nordic mountain grasshopper or narrow-winged locust, is a species of spur-throated grasshopper in the family Acrididae. It is found in Europe and Northern Asia (excluding China).

References

Further reading

External links

 

Melanoplinae
Articles created by Qbugbot
Insects described in 1846